The army groups (also translated as group armies) of the National Revolutionary Army were the largest conventional mobile formations in the organization of the army of the Republic of China during the Second Sino-Japanese War. The first army groups were established immediately after the Japanese attack at Marco Polo Bridge on 7 July 1937, and new army groups continued to be formed throughout the war.

During the war, the only military formations larger than the army group were the military regions, which were defined by geographical boundaries, and the army corps, of which only four were formed and only during the Battle of Wuhan. In effect, the army group was the largest fighting unit of the National Revolutionary Army, and usually exercised command over two or more field armies or several corps, and assorted lesser units. They were roughly equivalent in size to an Army in British or American military terminology. By the end of the war with Japan, 40 army groups of China were in existence. The civil war saw three additional army groups being formed, even as they were gradually being replaced by newly formed army corps, by then a largely analogous formation. The following list provides an overview of the army groups in the National Revolutionary Army, including their organization, commanders, and important battles.

1st to 10th army groups

Commanders killed in action are denoted by

11th to 20th army groups

21st to 30th army groups

31st to 40th army groups

41st to 43rd army groups 
Three army groups were established and disbanded during the Chinese Civil War with the communists.  No additional information is available.

References

External links 
 40 Army Groups in China's War of Resistance Against Japan 

Units and formations of the National Revolutionary Army
Second Sino-Japanese War
Chinese Civil War
National Revolutionary Army, Army Groups of